Gilles Zok (born 25 May 1954) is a French male canoeist who won four world championships in C1 at individual senior level at the Wildwater Canoeing World Championships.

References

External links
 Gilles Zok at Rivieres

1954 births
Living people
French male canoeists
Sportspeople from Vienne, Isère